Ayutla may refer to:

Ayutla, San Marcos, a municipality in the San Marcos department of Guatemala. 
Ayutla de los Libres, a small town located in the Mexican state of Guerrero.
Ayutla, Jalisco, a town in the Mexican state of Jalisco.
San Felipe Ayutla, a town in Izúcar de Matamoros, Puebla.
The Plan of Ayutla was proclaimed in Ayutla, Guerrero.
San Pedro y San Pablo Ayutla, Oaxaca